La feria de las flores  (English: "The flower fair") is a 1943 film directed by José Benavides, Jr. based on a story by Rafael M Saavedra. Starring Antonio Badú, María Luisa Zea and Stella Inda. Pedro Infante also appears in the film in one of his first starring roles as Rosendo, Valentín's friend.

This film is considered Infante's first professional starring role, although it is his second starring role and his third full-length feature film. His first film appearance was in El Organillero (short) in 1939. It is also the first film that Infante appears on horseback, not just riding but singing as well. And since he did not have the opportunity to ride horseback previously, he received charreria (specific type of horsemanship) lessons from Don Miguel Lara Guerrero each morning at 7am for the making of the film.

Songs 
 La feria de las flores (The flower fair) by Chucho Monge as (as Jesus Monge)
 A ver que pasa (Let's see what happens) by Chucho Monge

Cast 
 Antonio Badú as Valentín Mancera
 María Luisa Zea as Sanjuana González
 Stella Inda as Virginia (as Estela Inda)
 Luis G. Barreiro as Doctor Ronzoña
 Fernando Fernández as Cipriano
 Pedro Infante as Rosendo, friend of Valentín
 Víctor Junco as Comandente
 Tito Junco as Pablo
 Ángel T. Sala as Don Dionisio Catalán
 Salvador Quiroz as Don Ausencio, chief of police
 Adelita Herrera as Asunción
 Trío Calaveras

References

External links 
 
 

1943 films
Mexican adventure drama films
1940s Spanish-language films